Snook's Harbour is a settlement in Newfoundland and Labrador. Snook’s Harbour is on the island of Random Island and is part of the Local Service District of Random Island West.

Populated places in Newfoundland and Labrador